Castletown-Kinneigh, also known simply either as Castletown or as Kinneigh, is a small rural village near Ballineen in County Cork, Ireland.

The village has a round tower which is one of only two such towers in County Cork (the other is at Cloyne in East Cork). Home to the Diarmuid O'Mathuna GAA Club which was founded in Cookie O'Callaghan's Bar in 1968. Castletown, the village itself has one pub, owned by the O'Callaghan family. Castletown also has a soccer team named Castletown Celtic FC and has historically played in the West Cork League, winning the Beamish Cup twice and reaching several finals.

See also
 List of towns and villages in Ireland

References

External links
 Castletown Kinneigh Photos - John Murphy

Towns and villages in County Cork